Union Baptist Cemetery located at 4933 Cleves Warsaw Pike, in the Price Hill neighborhood, is a registered historic district in Cincinnati, Ohio, listed in the National Register of Historic Places on September 20, 2002. It contains a single contributing building. The cemetery is the oldest Baptist African-American cemetery in Cincinnati.

History
The cemetery was established by the Union Baptist Church in 1864 by members of the Union Baptist Church. Almost 150 other USCT veterans are buried at Union Baptist Cemetery.

Notable burials
 Newt Allen, a Negro league baseball player
  Powhatan Beaty, a Medal of Honor recipient and American Civil War veteran of the 5th United States Colored Infantry Regiment. 
 Bishop Mary Beck Bell, founder of the Spiritualist Church of the Soul
 Tiny Bradshaw, musician 
  Edith Hern Fossett, enslaved cook for Thomas Jefferson at President's House (White House) and head cook at Monticello
 Hon. George W. Hayes
 David Leroy Nickens
 Consuelo Clark-Stewart 
 Jennie Porter, founder of the Harriet Beecher Stowe School
 Wallace "Bud" Smith, boxer

Notes

External links
 

Cemeteries in Cincinnati
Historic districts in Cincinnati
African-American cemeteries
African-American history in Cincinnati
Baptist cemeteries in the United States
National Register of Historic Places in Cincinnati
Historic districts on the National Register of Historic Places in Ohio